Ebenia is a genus of parasitic flies in the family Tachinidae.

Species
Ebenia claripennis Macquart, 1846
Ebenia fumata (Wulp, 1895)
Ebenia trichopoda (Wulp, 1891)

References

Dexiinae
Tachinidae genera
Diptera of North America
Diptera of South America
Taxa named by Pierre-Justin-Marie Macquart